The Savlek is a river in Perm Krai, Russia, a right tributary of the Turka, which in turn is a tributary of the Iren.

References 

Rivers of Perm Krai